A Touch of Love is a 1969 British drama film directed by Waris Hussein and starring Sandy Dennis. It was adapted by Margaret Drabble from her novel The Millstone (1965). It was entered into the 19th Berlin International Film Festival.

Plot
Rosamund Stacey (Sandy Dennis), a young 'bookish' girl in London society, spends her days studying for a doctorate in the British Museum and her nights avoiding the sexual attention of the men in her life. One day, all that changes; through a friend, she is introduced to rising TV newsreader/announcer George Matthews (Ian McKellen). After a further chance meeting and a tumble on the sofa, she finds herself pregnant from her first sexual encounter. After a failed attempt at self-induced abortion, Rosamund resolves to have the child, leaving her on a solitary and at times discouraging path through pregnancy and into single motherhood, aided only by her close friend Lydia (Eleanor Bron).

Cast
 Sandy Dennis as Rosamund 
 Ian McKellen as George
 Michael Coles as Joe
 John Standing as Roger
 Peggy Thorpe-Bates as Mrs. Stacey
 Kenneth Benda as Mr. Stacey
 Deborah Stanford as Beatrice
 Roger Hammond as Mike
 Eleanor Bron as Lydia 
 Margaret Tyzack as Sister Bennett
 Maurice Denham as Doctor Prothero
 Rachel Kempson as Sister Harvey

Reception
Milton Subotsky says the film was not a box office success but since the filmmakers sold it to the distributors for more than its cost, they made a profit. Rosenberg later said it was in his opinion the best movie that Amicus produced.

References

External links
 

1969 films
1969 drama films
British Lion Films films
1969 directorial debut films
Amicus Productions films
British drama films
British pregnancy films
Casual sex in films
Films about virginity
Films based on British novels
Films directed by Waris Hussein
Films set in London
1960s English-language films
1960s British films